Riaan O'Neill (born 24 May 1994) is a Zimbabwe rugby union player, currently playing for the  in the 2022 Currie Cup First Division. His preferred position is fly-half, centre, wing or fullback.

Professional career
O'Neill represented Zimbabwe Academy in the 2019 Rugby Challenge. He was then named in the  squad for the 2022 Currie Cup First Division. O'Neill is a Zimbabwean international in both 15-a-side and sevens.

References

External links
itsrugby.co.uk Profile

1994 births
Living people
Rugby union fly-halves
Rugby union centres
Rugby union wings
Rugby union fullbacks
Zimbabwean rugby union players
Zimbabwe international rugby union players
Zimbabwe Academy rugby union players
Zimbabwe Goshawks players